American Society of Safety Professionals (ASSP), formerly known as American Society of Safety Engineers (ASSE) until June 2018, is a global organization of more than 37,000 occupational safety and health (OSH) professional members who manage, supervise, research and consult on work-related OSH concerns in all industries, government and education. The Society's members use risk-based approaches to prevent workplace fatalities, injuries and illnesses.

The organization was founded on 25 March 1911 in the wake of the Triangle Shirtwaist Factory fire, where the lack of safety measures caused the death of 146 garment workers.

ASSP offers continuing education to OSH professionals, participates in developing consensus industry standards, pursues initiatives that aim to build the OSH profession's reputation, and provides access to various member communities organized around geographic location, industry, gender, age and ethnicity. The organization has alliances with federal agencies such as Occupational Safety and Health Administration and National Institute for Occupational Safety and Health. ASSP also works with ABET to develop accreditation standards for OSH-related degree programs and has worked with the International Network of Safety and Health Practitioner Organizations (INSHPO) to develop a professional capability framework for OSH professionals.

Organization 
ASSP has 151 local chapters, 40 sections and 65 student sections located in 75 countries. Members live in regions including the Americas, Europe, the Middle East, Africa, Asia and Australia.

ASSP has practice specialty communities that focus on a particular industry or field of professional practice. These groups cover academia, construction, consulting, engineering, environment, ergonomics, fire protection, healthcare, industrial hygiene, international, management, manufacturing, oil, gas, mining and minerals, public sector, risk management/insurance and transportation. The organization also has four common interest groups – Blacks in Safety Excellence (BISE), Hispanic Safety Professionals, Women in Safety Excellence (WISE) and Young Professionals in OSH.

Consensus Standards
ASSP is secretariat for several American National Standards Institute (ANSI) committees and projects, and administrator for the U.S. technical advisory groups (TAG) to the International Organization for Standardization (ISO) on fall protection, risk management and occupational health and safety management systems. Members represent the organization on a wide range of safety and health standards committees affiliated with standards-development organizations such as National Fire Protection Association (NFPA), International Safety Equipment Association (ISEA) and ASTM International.

The committees develop and maintain the standards, ensure that the revision process is timely and in accordance with ANSI procedures, and publish the final product.

ASSP is secretariat/TAG for the following standards:

 Confined Spaces, Z117
Construction and Demolition Operations, A10
Fall Protection and Fall Restraint, Z359
 Fleet Safety, Z15
 Hydrogen Sulfide Training, Z390
Lockout/Tagout and Alternative Methods, Z244
 Occupational Health and Safety Management Systems, Z10, ISO 45001
 OSH Training, Z490
 Prevention Through Design, Z590.3
 Risk Management, ISO 31000/ANSI/ASSP Z690
Scope and Functions of the Professional Safety Position, Z590.2
 Ventilation Systems, Z9
 Walking/Working Surfaces, A1264

Center for Safety and Health Sustainability
The Center for Safety and Health Sustainability is a global collaborative effort among ASSP, the American Industrial Hygiene Association (AIHA), and the United Kingdom’s Institution of Occupational Safety and Health (IOSH).

Its work focuses on improving corporate recognition of employee safety, health and well-being as a sustainable business practice.

ASSP Foundation
The American Society of Safety Professionals Foundation, established by and in partnership with ASSP, generates funding and provides resources for research opportunities, educational advancement and leadership development in order to advance the OSH profession. As a 501(c)(3) organization, contributions to the Foundation are generally considered charitable contributions under IRC Section 170 and are tax deductible as provided by law.

See also
 Loss-control consultant
 ASME

References

External links
American Society of Safety Professionals official website
 Occupational Safety and Health Administration official website
American Society of Safety Professionals Foundation official website

Engineering societies based in the United States
Safety engineering organizations
Triangle Shirtwaist Factory fire
Occupational safety and health organizations
Organizations established in 1911
1911 establishments in the United States